Appelsín is a fizzy orange-flavored soft drink, manufactured by Egill Skallagrímsson Brewery in Iceland since 1955. The products are accompanied by the slogan ‚hið eina sanna‘, meaning 'the one and only‘. During Christmas time, it's traditionally mixed with Malt (Maltextrakt), called Jólaöl (Christmas ale), also available pre-mixed. To prevent the foam from overflowing, the Appelsín can be poured before the Malt.

References

Soft drinks
Icelandic drinks
Christmas in Iceland